The women's 500 m speed skating competition for the 2006 Winter Olympics was held in Turin, Italy. The competition consisted of two separate 500 metre races, with the competitors ranked by their cumulative time from the two races.

Records
Prior to this competition, the existing world and Olympic records were as follows.

500 meters (1 race)

500 meters x 2 (2 races)

No new world or Olympic records were set during this competition.

Results 

The race was held on 14 February 2006. 34-year-old Russian Svetlana Zhurova, who left speed skating in 2003 to become a mother and completed in her fourth Olympics after returning to the sport in 2004, became the oldest woman to win a speed skating gold medal by clocking times of 38.23 and 38.34. In the last pair of the second round, she beat Chinese Wang Manli, runner-up in the first round with 38.31, by 0.13 seconds to secure the gold medal. Skaters from Asia occupied seven of the top nine places.

References

External links
 Women's 500m - Final - Simple Results, from NBCOlympics.com, retrieved 13 February 2006.

Women's speed skating at the 2006 Winter Olympics